The JXD S5100 is a 5-inch Android tablet and portable game console produced by JXD. It was released in 2012 and resembles Nintendo's Wii U GamePad. Unlike the previous Sony-style JXD models, the S5100 lacks shoulder buttons.

Features
In addition to its 5-inch, five-point capacitive touch screen, the S5100 features four face buttons, a start and a select button, home, back and menu buttons, an accelerometer, a 0.3 megapixel front camera, and a 0.2 megapixel back camera that can be used to capture photos. On the bottom of the unit is an MicroSD card slot. On the top is a 5-volt AC jack, a Mini USB port, a Mini HDMI port, and a headphone jack.

It ships with 4GB internal storage space and supports up to 32GB expandable storage via-the MicroSD card slot on the bottom.

Revisions
About a month or two after the S5100 was released, JXD released the S603, a 4.3-inch version of the S5100 that runs Android 2.3 Gingerbread with a GP33003 CPU and 512MB RAM DDR3. In fall 2012, JXD also announced the S5600, which was to be an S5100 with Android 4.1 Jelly Bean, a five-point capacitive touch screen, two analog circle pads, four shoulder buttons, a dual-core processor, and 1GB RAM DDR3. It was planned to be released alongside the popular S7300 model, but it was later replaced by the S5110b, which instead uses the earlier S5110's shell.

See also
 JXD
 Android (operating system)
 Dingoo A320
 GCW Zero
 Nintendo 3DS
 Xperia Play

References

External links
 Official Website (S603)

Tablet computers introduced in 2012
2010s toys
Handheld game consoles
Tablet computers
Android (operating system) devices
Android-based video game consoles
Portable media players
ARM-based video game consoles